Haber is a genus of annelids belonging to the family Naididae.

The species of this genus are found in Europe, Russia and Northern America.

Species:

Haber amurensis 
Haber dojranensis 
Haber hubsugulensis 
Haber monfalconensis 
Haber pyrenaicus 
Haber speciosus 
Haber svirenkoi 
Haber swirenkoi 
Haber turquinae 
Haber vetus

References

Annelids